John & Yoko: Above Us Only Sky is a documentary film that aired on Channel 4 in November 2018 and the A&E Network in March 2019. The focus of the documentary is John Lennon's and Yoko Ono's relationship up to that point and how it impacted the Imagine album recorded in 1971 at their Tittenhurst Park home in Ascot, England.  Video footage not previously presented to the public is made available. Present day interviews with former bandmates and others involved in Lennon's and Ono's lives at the time are included in the film.

See also
Imagine: John Lennon (a 1988 British rockumentary film about English musician John Lennon)
Imagine (1972 film)
The Beatles in film

References

External links
 
 

John Lennon
Yoko Ono
2018 television films
2018 films
British documentary films
Films about John Lennon
Television programmes about the Beatles
Documentary films about the Beatles
2010s British films